Georges Schroeder (born 17 February 1950) is a Belgian athlete. He competed in the men's shot put and the men's discus throw at the 1976 Summer Olympics.

References

1950 births
Living people
Athletes (track and field) at the 1976 Summer Olympics
Belgian male shot putters
Belgian male discus throwers
Olympic athletes of Belgium
Place of birth missing (living people)